Liliana Mercado Fuentes (born 22 October 1988) is a Mexican footballer who plays as a midfielder for Liga MX Femenil club Tigres UANL.

She has also capped for the Mexico national team.

Honours

Club
UANL
Liga MX Femenil: Clausura 2018
Liga MX Femenil: Clausura 2019

References

External links
 
 

1988 births
Living people
Women's association football midfielders
Mexican women's footballers
Footballers from the State of Mexico
Mexico women's international footballers
2011 FIFA Women's World Cup players
Pan American Games bronze medalists for Mexico
Pan American Games medalists in football
Footballers at the 2011 Pan American Games
Footballers at the 2019 Pan American Games
Universiade silver medalists for Mexico
Universiade medalists in football
Liga MX Femenil players
Tigres UANL (women) footballers
Medalists at the 2013 Summer Universiade
Medalists at the 2011 Pan American Games
Mexican footballers